Aldo Morandi was the alias of Riccardo Formica (1896–1975), an Italian communist/antifascist.

In 1936, he was persuaded by the French Communist Party to enroll in the International Brigades of the Spanish Civil War and fight against the nationalist faction. On 30 November, he came in Spain and joined the Spanish Communist Party. After having been promoted to the degree of captain in Albacete, on 23 December Morandi became chief of staff of the XIV International Brigade, which was right away assigned in Andalusia. Arrived at the fron of Madrid, on 14 February he was appointed commander of the 21st and 24th battalion involved in the Battle of Jarama, during which Morandi reported a wound at the level of the thigh. Subsequently, he became the head of the 86th Mixed Brigade and 63rd Division deployed in Córdoba.

Notes

Further reading 
 Pietro Ramella, In nome della libertà, diario de Riccardo Formica, alias Aldo Morandi, Mursia, 2003.

1896 births
Italian communists
Communist Party of Spain politicians
International Brigades personnel
Italian military personnel of World War I
Italian military personnel of World War II
1975 deaths
Italian Freemasons
Italian expatriates in Spain